Radavc (also known as Radac, or Kryedrin) is a village located in Pejë, Kosovo.

History 
This village was likely inhabited since prehistoric times. A man's femur was reportedly discovered in the Radavc Cave. Due to its lack of written history, the majority of the village's history is known through tradition.

Demographics 
The exact population of Radavc is unknown. All inhabitants of the village are ethnic Kosovar Albanians.

Attractions 

Radavc has seen a considerable growth in tourism and tourist attractions since the turn of the century. This is, in part, thanks to the opening of the resort at the White Drin Waterfall. There are also several other restaurants that take advantage of the village's natural scenery. The Radavc Cave is also open for tourism. There is also a mill in the village that has been run by the Bërdynaj family, the largest family of the village, for at least 250 years.

Geography 
Radavc is located about 4.6 km (2.9 mi) north of the city of Peja. It is also about 5 km (3.1 mi) east of Kosovo's border with Montenegro. To the north and west of the village are the Accursed Mountains. The village is relatively hilly.

Climate 
Radavc has a climate that is very typical for its surrounding areas. The winters are cold and harsh whereas the summers are hot and relatively humid. Due to its proximity to the Adriatic Sea, Radavc has mild Mediterranean influence during the summers. The village's coldest month is January and its hottest is July.

References 

Villages in Peja